Robert B. Barnett (born August 26, 1946) is an American lawyer who is a partner at the law firm Williams & Connolly.

Family, early life, and education
Robert Bruce Barnett was born to a Jewish family on August 26, 1946, in Waukegan, Illinois, the son of Betty and Bernard Barnett. His father ran the Waukegan office of the Social Security Administration and had a popular call-in radio show that offered advice on federal retirement benefits. In 1964, he graduated from Waukegan High School where he served as senior class president. In 1968, he graduated with a bachelor's degree in political science from the University of Wisconsin-Madison (where he was a member of Pi Lambda Phi fraternity)  and in 1971, he graduated with a J.D. degree from the University of Chicago where he was comment editor for the University of Chicago Law Review.

On April 10, 1972, he married Rita Braver whom he met while in college. They have a daughter, Meredith Jane Barnett (born 1978); Meredith married Dr. Daniel Ross Penn, April 6, 2008.

Career
After school, he clerked for John Minor Wisdom in New Orleans (where he married Rita Braver who accepted a job at CBS affiliate WWL-TV). In 1972, the couple moved to Washington, D.C. where he clerked for Supreme Court justice Byron White (replacing David E. Kendall) and his wife became a news-desk editor at the CBS News bureau. After his one-year clerkship, he accepted a position as aide to Minnesota Senator Walter Mondale who assigned him the task of soliciting support for legislation to curb filibusters. He became close friends with fellow Mondale aide Michael Berman.

In 1975, he was hired by Joseph A. Califano Jr. and joined the law firm of Williams, Connolly & Califano. Soon after, Mondale was chosen as Jimmy Carter's presidential running mate and Barnett took a leave of absence from his law firm and went to Atlanta to help run Carter's campaign. After Carter's win, Barnett returned to his law practice. He made a name for himself defending white-collar clients including Toyota distributor, Jim Moran and former head of Fannie Mae, Franklin Raines. In 1984, Barnett helped to prep Mondale's running mate, Geraldine Ferraro, for her debate against George H. W. Bush; and defended her from accusations about her husband's alleged Mob affiliations and questionable tax returns. He also represented David Stockman and Kitty Dukakis, helping both to secure lucrative contracts with book publishers. In 1992, he again served as a debate coach this time for Bill Clinton in his successful presidential campaign. Returning to private practice, he found many customers eager to have him represent them in securing lucrative contracts and advances for their books, including Secretary of State James Baker; former Vice President Dan Quayle and that of his wife Marilyn Quayle; and James Carville and his wife Mary Matalin. He also expanded into representing television news people in contract negotiations including his wife, Rita Braver, Susan Mercandetti, Robin Lloyd, Chris Wallace, Andrea Mitchell, Brit Hume, Wolf Blitzer, and Ann Curry.

In 1992, he became the personal attorney of Hillary Clinton (per her memoir) and assisted the Clintons when their aide Vince Foster committed suicide. After criticism arose as to whether it was appropriate for Barnett to represent so many newscasters and journalists who were reporting on the White House while also serving as lawyer to the Clintons; Barnett resigned from representing the Clintons turning his work over to fellow Williams, Connolly & Califano attorney David E. Kendall. He represented George Stephanopoulos in an incriminating book about the Clintons. In 1997, after his wife resigned from CBS, he went back to representing the Clintons, and helped to negotiate the sale of their post-presidential memoirs; and helped former Clinton officials to secure new employment (Donna Shalala as president of the University of Miami and Lawrence Summers as president of Harvard University. He also represented Dick Cheney, Laura Bush, Jenna Bush, George Tenet, Alan Greenspan, and Tony Blair in securing book contracts and advances with publishers. In December 2000, he auctioned Hillary Clinton's memoirs to Simon & Schuster for $8 million - then the 2nd-largest advance ever paid for a nonfiction title; and followed it in August 2001 with Bill Clinton's memoirs for $10 million, the largest nonfiction advance to date. He later secured multimillion-dollar book deals for Tim Russert; Edward Kennedy; Karl Rove (purchased by former client Mary Maitlin); and in 2004, Barack Obama with the reissuance of Dreams From My Father and sell The Audacity of Hope and Change We Can Believe In. Despite this, he remained a Hillary Clinton supporter and assisted her preparing for all her debates against Obama. Barnett prided himself on representing clients regardless of political affiliation and also assisted outgoing Republican officials Karen Hughes and Ari Fleischer in finding new positions.

He also served as a practice debate opponent for many Democratic presidential and vice-presidential candidates.

See also 

 Barack Obama Supreme Court candidates
 List of law clerks of the Supreme Court of the United States (Seat 6)

References

1946 births
American lawyers
Jewish American attorneys
American political consultants
Law clerks of the Supreme Court of the United States
Living people
People from Waukegan, Illinois
University of Chicago Law School alumni
University of Wisconsin–Madison College of Letters and Science alumni
21st-century American Jews